Chaudhry Sajjad-ul-Hassan is a Pakistani politician who had been a member of the National Assembly of Pakistan from 2008 to 2013.

Political career
He was elected to the National Assembly of Pakistan from Constituency NA-144 (Okara-II) as an independent candidate in 2008 Pakistani general election and later joined Pakistan Peoples Party (PPP). He received 77,795 votes and defeated Rao Sikandar Iqbal.

He ran for the seat of the National Assembly from Constituency NA-144 (Okara-II) as an independent candidate in 2013 Pakistani general election but was unsuccessful. He received 448 votes and lost the seat to Muhammad Arif Chaudhry.

He ran for the seat of the National Assembly from Constituency NA-144 (Okara-II) as a candidate of PPP in by-polls held in October 2015, but was unsuccessful. He received 4,300 votes and lost the seat to Chaudhry Riaz-ul-Haq.

References

Living people
Pakistani MNAs 2008–2013
1958 births